Petru Bogdan (29 January 1873 – 28 March 1944) was a Romanian chemist, educator, and politician. In 1926, he was elected a titular member of the Romanian Academy.

He was born in Cozmești, Iași County, the son of Vasile Bogdan (the mayor of the village) and Ana, née Timuș; his father died four years laters, during the Romanian War of Independence of 1877.

Bogdan was a professor at the University of Iași. He wrote the first treatise on physical chemistry in the Romanian language. In 1923, one of his students, Theodor V. Ionescu, who worked in plasma physics, was the first to defend a PhD thesis in physics at the University of Iași.

Bogdan was a member of the National Peasants' Party. He served as Mayor of Iași from January 1930 to March 1934.

He had 7 children, Margareta, Gheorghe, Maria, Elena, Ana, and Ioan; one of his grandsons was Ioan Petru Culianu.

Publications
Studiul Chimiei Fisicale (4 volumes)
 ITeoria cinetică, 
 IITermodinamica, 
 IIIElectrochimia, 
 IVStructura atomului. Radioactivitatea.

References

External links
University of Iași

Romanian chemists
Rectors of Alexandru Ioan Cuza University
Titular members of the Romanian Academy
Mayors of Iași
1873 births
1944 deaths
People from Iași County
Alexandru Ioan Cuza University alumni
Humboldt University of Berlin alumni
National Peasants' Party politicians